Angiolino Copeta (24 April 1919 – 1980) was an Italian Grand Prix motorcycle road racer. His best year was in 1953 when he won the Spanish Grand Prix and finished fourth in the 125cc world championship. He was born in Brescia on 24 April 1919, and died in 1980.

Motorcycle Grand Prix results

(Races in italics indicate the fastest lap)

References

Sources
Angelo Copeta career statistics at MotoGP.com

1919 births
1980 deaths
Italian motorcycle racers
125cc World Championship riders
Isle of Man TT riders